Procom, ProCom or PROCOM may refer to:

 Processes of Compounds (PROCOM), a process simulation software package; see 
 ProCom, the Promotion Commission of the World Association for Waterborne Transport Infrastructure
 Procom Technology, a company acquired by Sun Microsystems in 2005
 Protective Security Command (ProCom), a Singapore counter terrorism police unit